Boralanda (බොරලන්ද in Sinhala language) is a rural town in Sri Lanka. It is located in Badulla District of Uva Province, Sri Lanka.

The easiest access path to the Horton Plains National Park  is fallen through Boralanda via Ohiya.

Transport
Following bus routes are fallen through Boralanda
Haputale - Welimada (134)
Boralanda-Bandarawela (228 Via Diyatalawa)
Welimada - Ohiya- Hortan Plains  (B508)
Boralanda - Welimada (311 via Bogahakumbura and Keppetipola)
Haputale - Nuwaraeliya (via Bogahakumbura and Keppetipola)

Government Institutions
Agriculture Research Institute
Post Office
State Timber Corporation
Government Medical Centre
Police Training School

Some important places around Boralanda

Horton Plains National Park
St. Thomas' College, Guruthalawa
Ohiya
Rahangala Peak
 Hinnarangolla Temple
 Boralanda Farm
Welimada
Haputale
Diyatalawa

See also
Towns in Uva

References

Towns in Badulla District